Inanidrilus reginae is a species of clitellate oligochaete worm in the family Naididae. It was first found in Belize, on the Caribbean side of Central America. It lives in subtidal sand with seagrass.

References

Further reading
Nylander, Johan AA, Christer Erséus, and Mari Källersjö. "A test of monophyly of the gutless Phallodrilinae (Oligochaeta, Tubificidae) and the use of a 573‐bp region of the mitochondrial cytochrome oxidase I gene in analysis of annelid phylogeny." Zoologica Scripta 28.3‐4 (1999): 305-313.
Diaz, Robert J., and Christer Erseus. "Habitat preferences and species associations of shallow-water marine Tubificidae (Oligochaeta) from the barrier reef ecosystems off Belize, Central America." Aquatic Oligochaete Biology V. Springer Netherlands, 1994. 93-105.
Giere, Olav, et al. "A comparative structural study on bacterial symbioses of Caribbean gutless Tubificidae (Annelida, Oligochaeta)." Acta zoologica 76.4 (1995): 281-290.

External links

reginae
Invertebrates of Central America
Fauna of the Caribbean
Animals described in 1990
Taxa named by Christer Erséus